Radio Kaboesna is a South African community radio station based in the Northern Cape.

Coverage Areas & Frequencies 
 Nieuwoudtville
 Brandvlei
 Williston
 Citrusdal
 And surrounding areas

Broadcast Languages
 English
 Afrikaans
 Xhosa

Broadcast Time
 18 hours a day

Target Audience
LSM Groups 1 – 6

Programme Format
40% Music
60% Talk

Listenership Figures

Location 
 Calvinia, GJ Krieling Library, Voortreekker Road, Calvinia, 8190

References

External links
SAARF Website
Sentech Website

.

Community radio stations in South Africa
Mass media in the Northern Cape